Rochdale Town Centre is a tram stop and the terminus on the Oldham and Rochdale Line (ORL) of Greater Manchester's light-rail Metrolink system. It was constructed as part of Phase 3b of the system's expansion, and is located on Smith Street, adjacent to Rochdale Interchange and Number One Riverside, in central Rochdale, England. It opened on 31 March 2014.

Services

Services are mostly every 12 minutes on all routes.

References

 https://web.archive.org/web/20120211143030/http://www.lrta.org/Manchester/Oldham_Rochdale.html

External links

Rochdale Town Centre Metrolink station stop information
Rochdale Town Centre Metrolink station plans

Tram stops in the Metropolitan Borough of Rochdale
Tram stops on the East Didsbury to Rochdale line
Rochdale